Thalheim an der Thur is a municipality in the district of Andelfingen in the canton of Zürich in Switzerland.

History
Thalheim an der Thur is first mentioned in 1166 as Torlinchovin.  In 1257 it was mentioned as Torlinkon.  Until 1878 it was Dorlikon.  The name may have originated from the Alamanni name Torilo which originated in the 7th century.  However, as this name could easily be taken to mean "Fools' Village" (from the nowadays old-fashioned expression Tor, German for "fool"), the community was granted a name change to Thalheim an der Thur in 1878. The original name is still used in the area.

Geography
Of this area, 65.7% is used for agricultural purposes, while 21.9% is forested. Of the rest of the land, 9% is settled (buildings or roads) and the remainder (3.4%) is non-productive (rivers, glaciers or mountains).

The municipality, in contrast to its name, does not lie on the Thur river, but rather to the south.  In 1862, the first bridge was built over the Thur.  14 years later, it was ruined by a flood and was rebuilt three years later.  In 1875, the Winterthur–Etzwilen railway line was opened bringing the connection with the outside world.

Demographics
, 5.8% of the population was made up of foreign nationals. Over the last 10 years the population has grown at a rate of 23.3%. Most of the population speaks German  (93.1%), with Portuguese being second most common ( 2.0%) and Albanian being third ( 1.3%).

In the 2007 election the most popular party was the SVP which received 57% of the vote.  The next three most popular parties were the FDP (9.9%), the CSP (9.1%) and the SPS (8.6%).

The age distribution of the population is children and teenagers (0–19 years old) make up 23.5% of the population, while adults (20–64 years old) make up 65.9% and seniors (over 64 years old) make up 10.5%.  In Thalheim an der Thur about 79.8% of the population (between age 25-64) have completed either non-mandatory upper secondary education or additional higher education (either university or a Fachhochschule).

Thalheim an der Thur has an unemployment rate of 1.91%.  , there were 75 people employed in the primary economic sector and about 20 businesses involved in this sector.  29 people are employed in the secondary sector and there are 8 businesses in this sector.  42 people are employed in the tertiary sector, with 13 businesses in this sector.
The historical population is given in the following table:

Transport 
Thalheim-Altikon railway station is  served by Zurich S-Bahn line S29, which links Winterthur and Stein am Rhein.

External links

Characteristics of the municipality 
Official website 
The place name of Dorlikon

References

Municipalities of the canton of Zürich